Kikihia scutellaris, commonly known as lesser bronze cicada, is a species of cicada that is endemic to New Zealand. This species was first described by Francis Walker in 1850.

References

Cicadas of New Zealand
Insects described in 1850
Endemic fauna of New Zealand
Taxa named by Francis Walker (entomologist)
Cicadettini
Endemic insects of New Zealand